The Georgian numerals are the system of number names used in Georgian, a language spoken in the country of Georgia.  The Georgian numerals from 30 to 99 are constructed using a base-20 system, similar to the scheme used in Basque, French for numbers 80 through 99, or the notion of the score in English.

The symbols for numbers in modern Georgian texts are the same Arabic numerals used in English, except that the comma is used as the decimal separator, and digits in large numbers are divided into groups of three using spaces or periods (full stops).  An older method for writing numerals exists in which most of letters of the Georgian alphabet (including some obsolete letters) are each assigned a numeric value.

Cardinal numbers 

The Georgian cardinal numerals up to ten are primitives, as are the words for 20 and 100, and also "million", "billion", etc.  (The word for 1000, though, is not a primitive.)  Other cardinal numbers are formed from these primitives via a mixture of decimal (base-10) and vigesimal (base-20) structural principles.

The following chart shows the nominative forms of the primitive numbers.  Except for rva (8) and tskhra (9), these words are all consonant-final stems and may lose the final i in certain situations.

Numbers from 11 to 19 are formed from 1 through 9, respectively, by prefixing t (a shortened form of ati, 10) and adding met'i (= more).  In some cases, the prefixed t coalesces with the initial consonant of the root word to form a single consonant (t + s → ts; t + š → č; t + ts → ts), or induces metathesis in the root (t + rv → tvr).

Numbers between 20 and 99 use a vigesimal (base-20) system (comparable to 60–99 in French).  40, 60, and 80 are formed using 2, 3, and 4 (respectively), linked to the word for 20 by m (a vestigial multiplicative):

Any other number between 21 and 99 is formed using 20, 40, 60, or 80, dropping the final i, then adding da (= and) followed by the appropriate number from 1 to 19; e.g.:

The hundreds are formed by linking 2, 3, . . ., 10 directly to the word for 100 (without the multiplicative m used for 40, 60, and 80).  1000 is expressed as atasi (10 x 100), and multiples of 1000 are expressed using atasi — so, for example, 2000 is ori atasi (2 x 10 x 100).

The final i is dropped when a smaller number is added to a multiple of 100; e.g.:

Ordinal numerals

Numeric values of letters 

The Georgian numeral system is a system of representing numbers using letters of the Georgian alphabet. Numerical values in this system are obtained by simple addition of the component numerals, which are written greatest-to-least from left to right (e.g., ჩღჲთ = 1769, ჩყპზ = 1887, ციბ = 2012).  

*Both letters ჳ and უ  are equal to 400 in numerical value.

These letters have no numerical value.

See also 
 Georgian calendar

Notes

References 

 
 
 

Numerals
Georgian language
Georgian scripts